HMS Hoste was a Parker-class flotilla leader of the Royal Navy. She was built by Cammell Laird during the First World War, completing on 13 November 1916, but was lost in a collision with the destroyer  on 21 December that year.

Construction and design
The Parker-class was an improved version of the earlier  with the ships' bridge moved rearwards, and an improved gun layout.

The ship's main gun armament consisted of four QF  Mk IV guns mounted on the ships centreline, with the forward two guns superfiring so that one could fire over the other, with one gun between the second and third funnel and one aft. Two 2-pounder (40 mm) "pom-pom" anti-aircraft guns were fitted, while torpedo armament consisted of two sets of twin 21 inch (533 mm) torpedo tubes. The standard anti-submarine armament for flotilla leaders such as Hoste from June 1916 onwards was two Type D depth charges on chutes. This was not increased until after Hostes loss. The ship's complement was 116 officers and men.

Hoste, named for William Hoste, was laid down on  1 July 1915, launched on 16 August 1916 and commissioned on 13 November 1916.

Service
On commissioning, Hoste joined the Thirteenth Destroyer Flotilla, part of the Grand Fleet, with the pennant number G90. On 19 December 1916, the Grand Fleet left Scapa Flow to carry out exercises between Shetland and Norway. On the morning of 20 December, Hoste suffered a failure of her steering gear at high speed, almost colliding with several other ships, and was detached to return to Scapa with the destroyer  as escort. At about 01:30 hr on 21 December, in extremely poor weather, with gale-force winds and a heavy sea, Hostes rudder jammed again, forcing the ship into a sudden turn to port. Negro, following about  behind, collided with Hoste. The collision knocked two depth charges off Hostes stern which exploded, badly damaging the rear end of Hoste and blowing in the bottom of Negros hull, flooding her engine room. Negro sank quickly, and despite the efforts of the destroyer  to rescue survivors, 51 officers and men of Negros crew were killed. Marmion and  attempted to tow the crippled Hoste back to Scapa, but after three hours, Hoste began to founder. Despite the severe conditions, Marvel went alongside Hoste to rescue the crew of the sinking ship, and when repeatedly forced apart by the heavy seas, repeated the manoeuvre another twelve time. While Marvel sustained damage to her forecastle from repeated impacts between the two ships, she managed to rescue all but four of Hostes crew before Hoste finally sank. Eight officers and 126 men were rescued by Marvel.

Notes

Citations

References

External links
Photo

Parker-class flotilla leaders
World War I destroyers of the United Kingdom
Ships built on the River Mersey
1916 ships
Ships sunk in collisions
World War I shipwrecks in the North Sea